Kauhola Point Lighthouse was located near Kapa'au, on the "Big Island" of Hawaii, near the northern tip of the island.

On December 12, 2009, this structure was demolished due to erosion near its base.

See also

List of lighthouses in Hawaii

References

External links

Lighthouses completed in 1933
Lighthouses in Hawaii
Buildings and structures in Hawaii County, Hawaii
Historic American Engineering Record in Hawaii
1933 establishments in Hawaii
2009 disestablishments in Hawaii
Buildings and structures demolished in 2009